Schizotrichia is a genus of flowering plants in the tribe Tageteae within the family Asteraceae.

The generic name "Schizotrichia" means "split hair,"  referring to the forked nature of the plant's hairs.

 Species
 Schizotrichia eupatorioides Benth. - Amazonas Region in Peru
 Schizotrichia friasensis  - Piura Region in Peru
 Schizotrichia jelskii (Hieron.) Strother ex Loockerman, B.L.Turner & R.K.Jansen - Peru
 Schizotrichia lopez-mirandae - La Libertad Region in Peru
 Schizotrichia remota - Huánuco Region in Peru

References

Tageteae
Asteraceae genera
Flora of Peru